Mount Baxter is a large buttress-type mountain, located just south of O'Kane Canyon where it forms a rounded projection of the east escarpment of the Eisenhower Range, in Victoria Land, Antarctica.

Discovered by the British National Antarctic Expedition (1901–04) under Scott, who named it for Sir George and Lady Baxter of Dundee, supporters of the expedition.

References

Mountains of Victoria Land
Borchgrevink Coast
Two-thousanders of Antarctica